Let's Make the Impossible! is a 1958 Spanish comedy film adapted from the play "¡Viva lo imposible! o el contable de las estrellas", by Miguel Mihura and Joaquín Calvo Sotelo, and directed by Rafael Gil. It was entered into the 8th Berlin International Film Festival.

Cast
 Paquita Rico as Palmira López
 Manolo Morán as Don Sabino López (as Manolo Moran)
 Miguel Gila as Adriani
 Julio Núñez as Eusebio López (as Julio Nuñez)
 Julia Caba Alba as Rosa
 José Marco Davó as Don Emilio (as Jose Marco Davo)
 Fernando Sancho as John
 Raúl Cancio as Rodolfo (as Raul Cancio)
 Vicky Lagos as Margot
 Ángel Ter as Zozof (as Angel Ter)
 Tony Soler as Pilar
 Mario Morales
 Yelena Samarina as Eloísa (as Elena Samarina)
 Jesús Narro as (as Jesus Narro)

References

Bibliography
 de España, Rafael. Directory of Spanish and Portuguese film-makers and films. Greenwood Press, 1994.

External links

1958 films
1950s Spanish-language films
1958 comedy films
Films directed by Rafael Gil
Spanish comedy films
1950s Spanish films